Frank Pesce (December 8, 1946 – February 6, 2022)  was an American film and television actor.

Early life 
Born in New York City, Pesce was the son of two working-class Italian-American parents.

Career 
Pesce started his film career as an extra in The Godfather Part II, and got his first credited role in 1976, in an episode of the television series Police Story. He guest-starred a large number of well-known TV-series, including Knight Rider, Kojak and Matlock, and was a busy character actor in films, notably appearing in Rocky, Top Gun, Beverly Hills Cop and Flashdance. He wrote the script of the film 29th Street, based on his own autobiographical experiences. He made his last appearance in 2015, in Creed.

Personal life 
A cancer survivor, Pesce died of dementia complications on February 6, 2022, at the age of 75.

Filmography

Film

Television

References

External links 
 

1946 births
2022 deaths
American male film actors
American male television actors
American people of Italian descent
Male actors from New York City
Deaths from dementia in California